Quezon's Game is a 2018 Philippine biographical drama film directed by Matthew Rosen. The film centers on Philippine President Manuel L. Quezon and his plan to shelter German and Austrian Jews in the Philippines who were fleeing Nazi Germany during the pre-World War II era.

Premise
In 1938, Philippine President Manuel L. Quezon, military adviser Dwight D. Eisenhower, along with other notable figures, set out to rescue Jewish refugees fleeing Nazi Germany. Quezon simultaneously deals with a relapse of tuberculosis.

Cast
Raymond Bagatsing as Manuel L. Quezon
Rachel Alejandro as Aurora Quezon
Kate Alejandrino as María Aurora "Baby" Quezon
David Bianco as Dwight D. Eisenhower
James Paoleli as Paul V. McNutt
Jennifer Blair-Bianco as Mamie Eisenhower
Audie Gemora as Sergio Osmeña
Billy Ray Gallion as Alex Frieder
Tony Ahn as Herbert Frieder
Hamilton McLeod as Douglas MacArthur
Natalia Moon as Vera

Production
Quezon's Game  is a joint venture production of Star Cinema, iWant, and Kinetek. The film was directed by Matthew Rosen who is British-Jewish, and the film had a production budget of US$500 thousand. The film produced in color runs for 125 minutes and is filmed in English, Spanish, and Tagalog. Production was finished by October 15, 2018. Rosen spent three months on casting for the film alone.

Lorena and Matthew Rosen were responsible for the film's original story idea while Janice Y. Perez and Dean Rosen wrote the screenplay. The film was produced to tell of a relatively unknown account of President Manuel L. Quezon rescuing Jewish refugees from the Holocaust and temporarily providing them shelter in the Philippines. One of the challenges the writers dealt with during Quezon's Game'''s research phase was the lack of Filipino historical manuscripts tackling the historical account. They referred to theses and dissertations made by Americans, and corresponded with the descendants of Alex and Herbert Frieder who played a major role in Quezon's plan.

Rosen who is an immigrant who moved to the Philippines in the 1980s, became aware of President Quezon's plan after he learned that his Filipino wife knew the lyrics to the Jewish folk song "Hava Nagila" and local children could sing it, while not being aware of its Jewish origin. Rosen started inquiring at a synagogue and its museum in Manila in 2009 which led him to learning about President Quezon's plan for Jews fleeing Nazi Germany.

ReleaseQuezon's Game was released in various international film festivals prior to its theatrical release. It was released in Ottawa, Canada as part of the gala event of the 2018 Cinema World Festival as one of the winning films of the 2018 Autumn Selection. It was also an entry in the IndieFEST Film in California, and the WorldFest-Houston International Film Festival in Texas.

As part of the film's promotion, a VIP screening was held on May 7, 2019 at the Power Plant Mall in Makati where ABS-CBN also presented video interviews of Holocaust Survivors Margot Pins Kestenbaum and Max Weissler, who were both provided shelter in the Philippines by Manuel Quezon and currently reside in Israel. The film's theatrical release in the Philippines was on May 29, 2019.

Spin-off
There will be a documentary series in iWant called The Last Manilaners: A Quezon’s Game Documentary which tells about the Jews who went to the Philippines describing their experience of prosecution and conflict in Nazi Germany and found new life.

Reception
The film received mixed reviews from critics. Rotten Tomatoes, a review aggregator, reports that  of  surveyed critics gave the film a positive review. On Metacritic, the film has a score of 36 out of 100 based on 6 reviews, indicating "generally unfavorable reviews".

The film won at least 20 awards as an entry in various international film festivals. In January 2019, Quezon's Game won 12 accolades at the Cinema World Fest Awards in Ottawa, Canada.

See also
List of Holocaust films
 Schindler's List
 Heneral Luna
 Goyo: The Boy GeneralBonifacio: Ang Unang Pangulo''

References

External links
 

2018 films
2010s historical drama films
2018 biographical drama films
Films about presidents of the Philippines
Films set in the Philippines
Films set in New York (state)
Films set in 1938
Cultural depictions of Dwight D. Eisenhower
Cultural depictions of Douglas MacArthur
Holocaust films
Philippine biographical films
Philippine historical drama films
Star Cinema films
2018 drama films